Microprotopus is a genus of amphipods belonging to the monotypic family Microprotopidae.

The species of this genus are found in Europe, America.

Species:

Microprotopus bicuspidatus 
Microprotopus longimanus 
Microprotopus maculatus 
Microprotopus raneyi 
Microprotopus shoemakeri

References

Amphipoda
Crustacean genera